A by-election was held for the New South Wales Legislative Assembly electorate of Mudgee on 29 June 1886 because of the resignation of John Robertson attributed to ill-health, financial difficulties and loss of the premiership.

Dates

Results

John Robertson resigned.

See also
Electoral results for the district of Mudgee
List of New South Wales state by-elections

References

1886 elections in Australia
New South Wales state by-elections
1880s in New South Wales